The Boy Detective Fails is the fourth novel by Chicago author 
Joe Meno, released by Punk Planet Books in 2006.

Plot summary
In the twilight of a childhood full of wonder, Billy Argo, Boy detective, is brokenhearted to find his young sister and crime-solving partner, Caroline, has committed suicide. Ten years later, Billy, age thirty, returns from an extended stay at Shady Glens Facility for Mental Competence to discover a world full of unimaginable strangeness: office buildings vanish without reason, small animals turn up without their heads, and cruel villains ride city buses to complete their evil schemes.

Lost within this unwelcoming place, Billy finds the companionship of two lonely children, Effie and Gus Mumford—one a science fair genius, the other a charming, silent bully. With a nearly forgotten bravery, Billy confronts the monotony of his job in telephone sales, the awkward beauty of a desperate pickpocket named Penny Maple, and the seemingly impossible solution to the mystery of his sister's death. Along a path laden with hidden clues and codes that dare to be deciphered, the boy detective may learn the greatest secret of all: the necessity of the unknown.

Musical

Author Joe Meno collaborated with composer and lyricist Adam Gwon to adapt the novel into a musical of the same name, which premiered in August–October 2011 at the Signature Theatre (Arlington, Virginia).

Nine years after the run at Signature Theatre, director/playwright Aaron Posner directed a new version of the musical at American University's Greenberg Theatre for a four-show run from February 13–15, 2020. This new version was developed in workshop with Joe Meno and Adam Gwon, and featured cuts, edits, new songs, and an adjusted plot/storyline.

Musical Characters 
Note: These are characters that appear only in the musical version, and are listed as so from the Characters section of the script.

Character List  

 Billy Argo
 Caroline Argo
 Fenton Mills
 Professor Von Golum
 Penny / Ensemble
 Larry / Mr. Mammoth / Ensemble
 Detective Brown / Ensemble
 Dale Hardly / Ensemble
 Violet Dew / Ensemble
 Therapist / Ensemble (Female)
 Nurse Eloise / Ensemble
 Ensemble

Cast

Musical Numbers 
Act 1

 "Prologue" – Company
 "Billy Argo, Boy Detective" – Company
 "Caroline" – Billy, Ensemble
 "Amazing" – Larry, Billy, Ensemble
 "Out of My Mind" – Von Golum, Billy, Ensemble
 "Old Tree House" – Billy, Caroline, Fenton, Ensemble
 "As Long As You Are Here" – Penny, Billy, Ensemble
 "Evil" – Von Golum, Billy, Ensemble
 "Haunted Mansion" – Billy, Caroline, Fenton, Ensemble
 "I Like (The Secret Song)" – Billy, Penny
 "After Secrets/Haunted" – Billy, Ensemble

Act 2

 "Entr'act" – Company
 "That's All" – Billy, Dale, Violet, Ensemble
 "Little Mysteries" – Penny, Billy
 "Amazing (Reprise)" – Larry, Billy, Ensemble
 "Billy Argo, Boy Detective (Reprise)" – Ensemble
 "Always" – Von Golum, Billy
 "Let Me Save You" – Billy, Ensemble
 "Finale" – Company

References

External links
 Amazon.com : Articles and reviews about 'The Boy Detective Fails'.

2006 American novels
Novels by Joe Meno